Richard Eifl Kilgour is an Anglican priest: he was Provost of St Andrew's Cathedral, Aberdeen from 2003 until 2015.

Biography 
Kilgour was born in 1957, educated at the University of Edinburgh and Edinburgh Theological College; and ordained in 1986. After a curacy at St Giles, Wrexham he was Vicar at St Mary & St Beuno, Whitford from 1988 to 1997. He was Rector of Llanllwchaiarn with Aberhafesp before his time as Provost; and general secretary of the International Christian Maritime Association afterwards.

References

1957 births
Alumni of the University of Edinburgh
Alumni of Edinburgh Theological College
Provosts of St Andrew's Cathedral, Aberdeen
Living people